Rohan Nurse (born 21 August 1983) is a Barbadian cricketer. He played in six first-class matches for the Barbados cricket team in 2009.

See also
 List of Barbadian representative cricketers

References

External links
 

1983 births
Living people
Barbadian cricketers
Barbados cricketers